Firewatch is a 2016 video game by Campo Santo.

Firewatch or fire watch may also refer to:

Firefighting, forestry and military
Another term for a fire lookout
A colloquialism for sentry duty in the United States Marine Corps, see General Orders for Sentries
if fire protection systems are out of service and a representative of the fire marshal's office must be present, this is called "on fire watch"

Entertainment
Fire Watch (book), 1984 collection of short stories by Connie Willis
"Fire Watch" (short story), the title story in the Connie Willis book

See also
Fire (disambiguation)
Watch (disambiguation)